is an arcade collectible card game in Bandai's Data Carddass line of machines, which launched on October 5, 2019. It is the spin-off and crossover to the Aikatsu!, Aikatsu Stars! and Aikatsu Friends! series of arcade games. The game revolves around using collectible cards featuring various clothes to help aspiring idols pass auditions.

An anime television adaptation by BN Pictures premiered from October 5, 2019 to March 28, 2020. A web season of the anime titled Aikatsu on Parade! Dream Story was announced to start airing from March 28, 2020 to July 11, 2020 after the television series ended, along with an addition to the Data Carddass game. A new Aikatsu! live-action/anime series titled Aikatsu Planet! was also announced and was originally set to premiere in October 2020, but it has been delayed to January 2021.

Plot

Raki Kiseki is a second-year middle school student who transfers to Star Harmony Academy to become an idol. However, when she uses an Aikatsu Pass she received from her elder sister Saya, an Aikatsu engineer, something mysterious happens. Many doors appeared before her, and when she opens them, she meets Aikatsu idols she never knew before, such as Ichigo Hoshimiya, Akari Ōzora and Yume Nijino. Raki vows to design her own premium rare dress and perform in it on stage.

Media

Anime 
An anime television series produced by BN Pictures aired on TV Tokyo from October 5, 2019, replacing the Japanese dub of PAW Patrol in its timeslot. A manga adaptation has been serialized in Pucchigumi since their November 2019 issue.

Online Animation

References

2019 anime television series debuts
2019 video games
Aikatsu!
Arcade video games
Arcade-only video games
Bandai Namco games
Bandai Namco Pictures
Japan-exclusive video games
Japanese idols in anime and manga
TV Tokyo original programming
Video games developed in Japan
Crossover animated television series